The East Bodish languages are a small group of non-Tibetic Bodish languages spoken in eastern Bhutan and adjacent areas of Tibet and India. They include:
 Dakpa (Tawang Monpa)
 Dzala
 Nyen, including Mangde and Phobjib
 Chali
 Bumthang
 Kheng
 Kurtöp

George van Driem initially proposed that 'Ole belonged to the group, but later decided that it belonged to a group of its own.

Although the East Bodish languages are closely related, Tshangla and related languages of eastern Bhutan, also called "Monpa" and predating Dzongkha, form a sister branch not to the East Bodish group, but to its parent Bodish branch.  Thus the ambiguous term "Monpa" risks separating languages that should be grouped together, whereas grouping languages together that are quite distinct. Zakhring is apparently also related, though strongly influenced by Miju or a similar language.

Internal classification

Hyslop (2010) classifies the East Bodish languages as follows.
East Bodish
Dakpa–Dzala
Dakpa
Dzala
(core branch)
Phobjip
Chali–Bumthang
Chali
Bumthangic
Bumthang
Kheng
Kurtöp
She regards the Dakpa–Dzala and Bumthangic subgroups as secure, and the placement of Phobjip and Chali as more tentative.

Lu (2002) divides the "Menba language" (门巴语) into the following subdivisions:
Southern: 30,000 speakers in Cona County, Lhoka (Shannan) Prefecture, Tibet
Mama dialect 麻玛土语: Mama Township 麻玛乡 (or 麻麻乡), Lebu District 勒布区
Dawang dialect 达旺土语: Dawang Township 达旺镇, Mendawang District 门达旺地区
Northern: 5,000 speakers in Mêdog County, Nyingchi Prefecture, Tibet
Wenlang dialect 文浪土语: Wenlang Township 文浪乡, Dexing District 德兴区
Banjin dialect 邦金土语: Bangjin District 邦金地区

Reconstruction
Hyslop (2014) reconstructs the following Proto-East Bodish forms.

 *kwa ‘tooth’
 *kra ‘hair’
 *kak ‘blood’
 *kʰrat ‘waist’
 *lak ‘hand’
 *ná ‘nose’
 *pOskOm (?) ‘knee’
 *rOs ‘bone’
 *gO- ‘head’
 *mE- ‘eye’
 *kram ‘otter’
 *ta ‘horse’
 *kʰa- ‘hen’
 *wam ‘bear’
 *kʰwi ‘dog’
 *kʰaça ‘deer’
 *zV ‘eat’
 *ra ‘come’
 *gal ‘go’
 *lok ‘pour’
 *dot ‘sleep’
 *bi ‘give’
 *kʰar ‘white’
 *mla ‘arrow’
 *gor ‘stone’
 *kʰwe/*tsʰi ‘water’
 *rO (?) ‘wind’
 *On (?) ‘baby’
 *daŋ ‘yesterday’
 *néŋ ‘year’
 *da- ‘today’
 *tʰek ‘one’
 *sum ‘three’
 *ble ‘four’
 *laŋa ‘five’
 *grok ‘six’
 *nís ‘seven’
 *gʲat ‘eight’
 *dOgO ‘nine’
 *kʰal(tʰek) ‘twenty’
 *ŋa ‘1.SG’
 *i/*nVn ‘2.SG’
 *kʰi/*ba ‘3.SG’
 *-ma ‘FUT’
 *lo ‘Q.COP’

Additional reconstructions can be found in Hyslop (2016).

References

 
 

 
Languages of Bhutan